Konstantin Aleksandrovich Smetanin (1898–1969; Russian: Константи́н Алекса́ндрович Смета́нин) was a diplomat from Soviet Union and member of the Communist Party.

Political career  
Became an advisor to the Soviet embassy in Japan in 1937. He was a member of Communist Party. From 21 September 1939 to 28 May 1942 he was a plenipotentiary representative of the Soviet Union in Japan, replacing Mikhail Slavutsky.

In May 1941, he exchanged ratification documents of the Soviet–Japanese Neutrality Pact signed in Moscow the previous month with the Minister for Foreign Affairs of Japan, Yōsuke Matsuoka. When Nazi Germany attacked Soviet Union in June 1941 starting Eastern Front of World War II, Smetanin requested Matsuoka to comply with the Neutrality Pact, however Japanese side replied that they had favour the Tripartite Pact agreement instead.

In August 1941, Teijirō Toyoda, new minister of foreign affairs of Japan undermined Matsuoka's decision and promised Smetanin that Japan would comply with the treaty. Shortly before the outbreak of the Pacific War between Japan and the United States, Smetanin had held several discussions with the minister of foreign affairs, Shigenori Tōgō, stating that USSR would not violate the Neutrality Pact.

He stopped being an ambassador to Japan on 28 May 1942, with Yakov Malik being appointed as his successor.

Bibliography 
 Diplomaticheskiy slovar by Andrei Gromyko, A.G. Kovaleva, P.P. Sevostyanov and S.L. Tikhvinsky, volume 3, Moscow, 1985-1986 page 42

References 

1898 births
1969 deaths
Soviet diplomats
Ambassadors of the Soviet Union to Japan